—or simply Asuka Fantasy DX or Fantasy DX—was a Japanese shōjo manga magazine published by Kadokawa Shoten. It was originally a bimonthly special issue of Monthly Asuka, but was spun off as a separate monthly magazine in June 1994. Manga published in this magazine were published through the Asuka Comics DX imprint from Kadokawa.
This magazine published titles of adventure, fantasy, and science fiction such as Angelique and Cowboy Bebop.

Selected series
The Heroic Legend of Arslan by Chisato Nakamura (1991-1996) (see article image to the right)
Fire Emblem Gaiden by Masaki Sano and Kyō Watanabe (1992)
Fire Emblem by Masaki Sano and Kyō Watanabe (1992-1997)
Angelique by Kairi Yura (1996)
Cowboy Bebop by Cain Kuga (1997-1998)
Magic User's Club by Junichi Sato (1996-1998)
Record of Lodoss War: Deedlit's Tale by Ryo Mizuno and Setsuko Yoneyama

Related magazines
 Monthly Asuka

External links
 Asuka Official website for Asuka 
 

1994 establishments in Japan
2000 disestablishments in Japan
Defunct magazines published in Japan
Kadokawa Shoten magazines
Magazines established in 1994
Magazines disestablished in 2000
Magazines published in Tokyo
Monthly manga magazines published in Japan
Asuka, Monthly